Super Bowl LVIII is the upcoming American football championship game of the National Football League (NFL) for the 2023 season. It will be the 58th Super Bowl and is scheduled to be played on February 11, 2024, at Allegiant Stadium in Paradise, Nevada. 

This will be the first Super Bowl that will be held in Nevada and the Las Vegas Valley area. The game will be televised nationally by CBS.

Background

Host selection
On May 23, 2018, the league initially selected New Orleans as the site for Super Bowl LVIII. The game, along with Super Bowl LVII, was part of a new awarding process implemented by the league that was introduced in Super Bowl LVI. In the previous process, cities that wished to host a Super Bowl submitted bids, which were deliberated and voted upon at the league owners' meetings. The new process no longer allows cities to bid for the game; the league now chooses the potential candidates.

In March 2020, the league and the NFLPA agreed to expand the regular season from 16 to 17 games beginning in 2021, pushing Super Bowl LVIII to February 11, 2024, and causing a conflict with New Orleans' Mardi Gras celebrations. The league formally announced on October 14, 2020, that New Orleans would host Super Bowl LIX instead of Super Bowl LVIII. On December 15, 2021, Las Vegas was chosen to host the game.

The official logo was unveiled on February 13, 2023; it follows the updated logo template introduced by Super Bowl LVI, with the traditional Roman numerals featuring sunset themed imagery of the host city/nearby area - in this case being the Las Vegas strip along with the "Welcome to Fabulous Las Vegas" sign, with the numerals slanted inward to evoke the architecture of resorts such as the Bellagio and Wynn Las Vegas.

Broadcasting

United States
Super Bowl LVIII will be televised by CBS, and will be the first Super Bowl to be broadcast under the new 11-year NFL television contract, which allows a four-year rotation between CBS, Fox, NBC, and ABC/ESPN.

International
In the United Kingdom and Ireland, the game will be televised on the free-to-air channel ITV and paid-subscription channel Sky Showcase (as well as its sister channels Sky Sports Main Event and NFL). It will be carried on radio via BBC Radio 5 Live.
In Australia, the game will be televised by the Seven Network as well as its sister channel 7mate and on demand platform 7plus.
In Latin America, the game will be televised by ESPN and its streaming and on-demand platform Star+.
In Germany and Austria, the game will be televised for the first time by RTL Group (RTL, Nitro), following the broadcasting right transfer from previous right-holder ProSieben.
In the Balkans, the game will be televised by Sport Klub, through internet providers subscription.

References

External links

Super Bowl
21st century in Las Vegas
2024 in American football
2024 in sports in Nevada
American football in Las Vegas
February 2024 sports events in the United States
Scheduled sports events
2023 National Football League season
Events in Paradise, Nevada
Sports competitions in Las Vegas